Glen Edward Gorbous (July 8, 1930 - June 12, 1990) was a Canadian professional baseball outfielder, who played in Major League Baseball (MLB) for the Cincinnati Redlegs, in early 1955, and the Philadelphia Phillies, from mid-1955 to May, 1957. 

Gorbous holds the current world record for longest throw of a baseball, 135.89m (445 feet, 10 inches).  The feat took place on August 1, 1957, while he was playing for the Omaha Cardinals of the American Association. In an exhibition he was given a six-step running start and threw the ball from the far right field corner of the stadium to the far left field corner. (Gorbous' world record was set after his brief major league baseball career had already ended.)

References

External links

1930 births
1990 deaths
Baseball people from Alberta
Bisbee-Douglas Copper Kings players
Canadian expatriate baseball players in the United States
Cincinnati Redlegs players
Major League Baseball right fielders
Philadelphia Phillies players
Elmira Pioneers players
Fort Worth Cats players
Medford Nuggets players
Miami Marlins (IL) players
Omaha Cardinals players
Pueblo Dodgers players
Spokane Indians players
Major League Baseball players from Canada
People from Drumheller